Martin Pakledinaz (September 1, 1953 – July 8, 2012) was an American costume designer for stage and film.

He won his Tony Awards for designing the costumes for Thoroughly Modern Millie and the 2000 revival of Kiss Me, Kate, which also earned him the Drama Desk Award for Outstanding Costume Design.

His most recent costume designs were for the Broadway shows Nice Work If You Can Get It (2012); Man and Boy (revival, 2011); Master Class (revival 2011) and The Normal Heart. He worked on the 1995 production of Holiday at the Circle in the Square Theatre.

He designed costumes for plays for the leading regional theatres of the United States, and the Royal Dramatic Theatre of Sweden.  Opera credits include works at the New York Metropolitan Opera (Lucia di Lammermoor, Rodelinda, Iphigénie en Tauride) and the New York City Opera, as well as opera houses in Seattle, Los Angeles, St. Louis, Santa Fe, Houston, and Toronto. European houses include Salzburg, Paris, Amsterdam, Brussels, Helsinki, Gothenburg, and others.

He also designed for dance companies, working with Mark Morris for many years.

Pakledinaz died from brain cancer on July 8, 2012 at the age of 58.

Shortly after his death, he was posthumously inducted into the American Theater Hall of Fame.

Education
Pakledinaz received a BFA from Wayne State University and an MFA (1975) from the University of Michigan.

References

External links
 
 
Biography from americantheatrewing.org as of July 2007
 Martin Pakledinaz Website 

1953 births
2012 deaths
American costume designers
Drama Desk Award winners
Tony Award winners
Wayne State University alumni
University of Michigan alumni